Gyula Molnár (born 13 November 1947) is a Hungarian wrestler. He competed in the men's Greco-Roman 57 kg at the 1980 Summer Olympics.

References

External links
 

1947 births
Living people
Hungarian male sport wrestlers
Olympic wrestlers of Hungary
Wrestlers at the 1980 Summer Olympics
Martial artists from Budapest